Robert Lee Nieman (born October 21, 1947) is an American modern pentathlete who competed at the 1976 and 1988 Summer Olympics. Although Nieman had qualified for the 1980 Olympic team he did not compete due to the Olympic Committee's boycott of the 1980 Summer Olympics in Moscow, Russia. He was one of 461 athletes to receive a Congressional Gold Medal instead. Nieman won a team silver medal in épée fencing event at the 1983 Pan American Games.

References

External links
 

1947 births
Living people
American male modern pentathletes
Olympic modern pentathletes of the United States
Modern pentathletes at the 1976 Summer Olympics
Modern pentathletes at the 1988 Summer Olympics
Sportspeople from Chicago
American male épée fencers
Pan American Games medalists in fencing
Pan American Games silver medalists for the United States
Competitors at the 1983 Pan American Games
Medalists at the 1983 Pan American Games
20th-century American people
21st-century American people